The Trofeo Alasport, also known as the Cross di Alà dei Sardi, is an annual cross country running competition which takes place in March in Alà dei Sardi on the Italian island of Sardinia. Unusually for a high-profile cross country event, it has often been held after the IAAF World Cross Country Championships which occurs in late March. The Trofeo Alasport is traditionally the final event of the cross country season in Italy.

The competition was initiated in 1973 by a local athletics enthusiast, Antonello Baltolu, and has been held on an annual basis since then by the local sports association, the Società Sportiva Alasport. It is one of the foremost competitions of its type in Italy, alongside the Cinque Mulini, and attracts international competitors of the highest calibre. Former winners of the event include numerous world cross country champions, such as Paul Tergat, John Ngugi, Kenenisa Bekele and Khalid Skah in the men's race, while Albertina Dias, Gete Wami and Jackline Maranga have won on the women's side.

The Trofeo Alasport began as a domestic event but quickly took on an international nature, with British Olympian John Bicourt becoming the first foreign winner at the fourth edition. Belgium's Léon Schots was the first world champion to take victory in Alà dei Sardi in 1983. African names came to dominate the winner's lists from the 1990s onwards, with Susan Sirma of Kenya ushering in the change with back-to-back victories in 1991 and 1992. In addition to these elite level races, amateur competitions are also featured on the programme of the day's events, as well as number of shorter youth-level races.

The competition has been held every year with the exceptions of 1980 and a brief suspension of the event between 2005 and 2007. Since 1986, the Trofeo Alasport has also been designated as the Trofeo Presidente della Repubblica, an honorific in recognition from the President of Italy.

Past elite race winners

See also
Campaccio
Cross della Vallagarina

References

List of winners
Albo d'Oro del Trofeo Alasport. S.S. Alasport. Retrieved on 2011-03-30.
Civai, Franco (2010-03-16). Cross di Alà dei Sardi. Association of Road Racing Statisticians. Retrieved on 2011-03-30.

External links
Official website

Cross country running competitions
Athletics competitions in Italy
Sport in Sardinia
Recurring sporting events established in 1973
Cross country running in Italy
Annual sporting events in Italy
1973 establishments in Italy
Spring (season) events in Italy